Rockets from the Ariane rocket family have accumulated 258 launches since 1979, 246 of which were successful, yielding a  success rate. The currently operational version, Ariane 5, has flown 82 consecutive missions without failure between April 2003 and December 2017, but suffered a malfunction during flight VA-241 in January 2018, causing its two satellites to reach an incorrect orbit, and reducing their predicted lifetime as they consumed some of their own fuel to raise their orbits.

For launches in a specific decade, see:
 List of Ariane launches (1979–1989)
 List of Ariane launches (1990–1999)
 List of Ariane launches (2000–2009)
 List of Ariane launches (2010–2019)
 List of Ariane launches (2020–2029)

Launch statistics

Rocket configurations

Launch outcomes

Statistics are up to date .

References 

 

 

de:Liste der Ariane-5-Raketenstarts
ru:Список пусков ракет-носителей «Ариан-5»
uk:Список запусків ракет-носіїв Аріан-5